American by Blood is a 2001 historical fiction novel by Andrew Huebner. It is his first novel and tells the story of three American Civil War scouts.

References 

2001 American novels
Novels set during the American Civil War
Simon & Schuster books
2001 debut novels